Sven Josef Cyvin (25 February 1931 – 19 September 2013) was a Norwegian chemist.

He was born in Czechoslovakia, but finished his secondary education at Trondheim Cathedral School in 1949 and graduated in chemical engineering at the Norwegian Institute of Technology in 1956. In 1960 he took the dr.techn. degree. From 1964 he was a docent, and from 1970 to his retirement he was a professor of theoretical chemistry at the Norwegian Institute of Technology. He was a fellow of the Norwegian Academy of Science and Letters and the Royal Norwegian Society of Sciences and Letters.

Cyvin was also active in the social movements Pugwash, Nei til Atomvåpen and Framtiden i våre hender.

References

1931 births
2013 deaths
Czechoslovak emigrants to Norway
People from Trondheim
People educated at the Trondheim Cathedral School
Norwegian Institute of Technology alumni
Academic staff of the Norwegian Institute of Technology
Academic staff of the Norwegian University of Science and Technology
Norwegian chemists
Members of the Norwegian Academy of Science and Letters
Royal Norwegian Society of Sciences and Letters
Norwegian anti–nuclear weapons activists